La Joya is a city in Hidalgo County, Texas. The population was 4,374 at the 2020 United States Census. It is part of the McAllen–Edinburg–Mission and Reynosa–McAllen metropolitan areas.

History
Its name, meaning "the jewel", was inspired by a small natural lake west of the city; early settlers were said to observe that the lake shined in the sun like a jewel. The site on which La Joya was founded was part of what was known as "Los Ejidos de Reynosa Viejo". The ejidos were the shared grazing lands used for the livestock of the settlers of Reynosa Viejo ("Old Reynosa"). During the early 1800s, at the site of what is now La Joya, Francisco de la Garza, a descendant of the early colonizers of the area who soon decided to change his last name from de la Garza to Garza, founded a community, called "Tabasco", adjacent to the northern bank of the Rio Grande. It was a prosperous community that died out after floods in 1908 and 1909. The settlers moved their belongings just north to higher and less flood-prone ground, present-day La Joya.

Geography

La Joya is located in southwestern Hidalgo County at  (26.241996, –98.480138). It is bordered to the east by the city of Peñitas and to the west by unincorporated Havana. Interstate 2 passes through the center of La Joya, leading east  to the center of McAllen and northwest  to Rio Grande City.

Walker Lake is in the southeast part of the city limits.

Demographics

2020 census

As of the 2020 United States census, there were 4,457 people, 1,235 households, and 880 families residing in the city.

2000 census
As of the census of 2000, there were 3,303 people, 860 households, and 766 families residing in the city. The population density was 1,187.6 people per square mile (458.7/km). There were 969 housing units at an average density of 348.4 per square mile (134.6/km). The racial makeup of the city was 63.94% White, 0.18% African American, 0.51% Native American, 0.48% Asian, 0.03% Pacific Islander, 33.18% from other races, and 1.67% from two or more races. Hispanic or Latino of any race were 97.18% of the population (Latinos and Hispanics are not an official race).

There were 860 households, out of which 51.3% had children under the age of 18 living with them, 66.0% were married couples living together, 18.8% had a female householder with no husband present, and 10.9% were non-families. 9.2% of all households were made up of individuals, and 5.1% had someone living alone who was 65 years of age or older. The average household size was 3.84 and the average family size was 4.10.

In the city, the population was spread out, with 34.9% under the age of 18, 12.2% from 18 to 24, 27.0% from 25 to 44, 17.4% from 45 to 64, and 8.4% who were 65 years of age or older. The median age was 27 years. For every 100 females, there were 88.7 males. For every 100 females age 18 and over, there were 86.1 males.

The median income for a household in the city was $22,820, and the median income for a family was $23,156. Males had a median income of $18,494 versus $14,597 for females. The per capita income for the city was $7,923. About 38.9% of families and 40.7% of the population were below the poverty line, including 50.6% of those under age 18 and 31.2% of those age 65 or over.

Government and infrastructure
The United States Postal Service operates the La Joya Post Office.

Education 
La Joya is served by the La Joya Independent School District. The zoned schools for residents of La Joya city are Tabasco Elementary School, Lorenzo de Zavala Middle School, and La Joya High School.

In addition, residents are allowed to apply to magnet schools operated by the South Texas Independent School District.

La Joya Public Library is located in the city.

Notable people

 Sergio Castillo, CFL Winnipeg Blue Bombers Place Kicker, 2021 Grey Cup Champion
 Macarena Hernández, award-winning journalist, educator and La Joya High School graduate
 Mayra Rosales, one of the heaviest women of all time

References
Mrs. James Watson, The Lower Rio Grande Valley of Texas and Its Builders (Mission, Texas, 1931)

External links

 City of La Joya official website
 La Joya Public Library
 The Handbook of Texas Online – La Joya

Cities in Texas
Cities in Hidalgo County, Texas